Deh-e Molla or Deh Molla may refer to:
 Deh-e Molla, Kerman
 Deh-e Molla Bozorg, Khuzestan Province
 Deh-e Molla Kuchek, Khuzestan Province
 Deh-e Molla, Markazi
 Deh Molla, Markazi
 Deh Molla, Razavi Khorasan
 Deh-e Molla, Semnan
 Deh Molla, Sistan and Baluchestan
 Deh-e Molla Rural District, in Semnan Province